Robert Otway-Cave (1796 – 29 November 1844), styled The Honourable from 1839, was an Irish aristocrat and British politician.

Life

Early life and succession
Born Robert Otway, he was the only surviving son of Henry Otway and his wife, the 3rd Baroness Braye, of Castle Otway, County Tipperary in Ireland. His uncle was Sir Robert Otway, 1st Baronet, an admiral in the Royal Navy. He was educated at Eton College and Christ Church, Oxford, matriculating in 1815.

Otway succeeded his father in 1815, inheriting the family seat at Castle Otway. In 1818, he took by royal sign manual the additional surname of Cave, the maiden name of his mother, to whose title he was heir apparent.

Political career
Otway-Cave entered the British House of Commons in 1826, sitting for Leicester the next four years. In August 1832, he was elected for Tipperary, which he represented until December. He was again returned for the constituency in 1835, a seat he held until his death in 1844.

Personal life
On 23 October 1833, he married Sophia Burdett, the eldest daughter of Sir Francis Burdett, 5th Baronet. Otway-Cave died aged 48, after a short illness, at Bath, Somerset. He had no issue; he was laid to rest in a family tomb in St Nicholas Church, Stanford-on-Avon, Northamptonshire. Castle Otway passed, on his wife's death in 1849, to his cousin, Vice-Admiral Robert Jocelyn Otway. The barony passed into abeyance in 1862 on the death of his mother.

References

External links

1796 births
1844 deaths
People educated at Eton College
Alumni of Christ Church, Oxford
Heirs apparent who never acceded
Members of the Parliament of the United Kingdom for English constituencies
Members of the Parliament of the United Kingdom for County Tipperary constituencies (1801–1922)
UK MPs 1826–1830
UK MPs 1831–1832
UK MPs 1835–1837
UK MPs 1837–1841
UK MPs 1841–1847
People from Nenagh
Committee members of the Society for the Diffusion of Useful Knowledge